The 2015 WPI Engineers football team represented Worcester Polytechnic Institute in the 2015 NCAA Division III football season. It marked the Engineers' 126th overall season and the team played its home games at Alumni Stadium in Worcester, Massachusetts. They were led by sixth year head coach Chris Robertson. They were a member of the Liberty League.

The Engineers finished the season with a winning record of 7-4.

Schedule
The 2015 schedule was officially released on June 22, 2015. WPI will face all seven Liberty League opponents: RPI, Hobart, Union, Merchant Marine, St. Lawrence, Rochester, and Springfield. They are also scheduled to play four non-conference games: MIT of the New England Football Conference (NEFC), Worcester State of the Massachusetts State Collegiate Athletic Conference (MSCAC), and Norwich of the NEFC.

References

WPI
WPI Engineers football seasons
WPI Engineers football